Joseph Cresswell (22 December 1865 – 19 July 1932) was an English cricketer who played first-class cricket for Warwickshire from 1895 to 1899.

Cresswell was born at Denby, Derbyshire, the son of Joseph Cresswell a beer house keeper and his wife Sarah Ann.  He joined Warwickshire in 1889 and until 1893 played regularly in matches that were not accorded first-class status. He made his first-class debut  in May 1895 in a match against Surrey when he took three wickets. He played a few games each season until 1899. He achieved his best bowling performance of 6 for 69 against Kent in 1896.

Cresswell played 22 innings in 15 first-class matches with an average of 10.53 and a top score of 16. He took 42 first-class wickets at an average of 27.23 and a best performance of 6 for 69.

Cresswell died at Birmingham at the age of 66. His nephew James Cresswell played cricket for Derbyshire.

References

1865 births
1932 deaths
Warwickshire cricketers
English cricketers
People from Denby
Cricketers from Derbyshire